German submarine U-1192 was a Type VIIC U-boat of Nazi Germany's Kriegsmarine during World War II.

She was ordered on 25 August 1941, and was laid down on 4 November 1942 at F Schichau GmbH, Danzig, as yard number 1562. She was launched on 16 July 1943 and commissioned under the command of Oberleutnant zur See Herbert Zeissler on 23 September 1943.

Design
German Type VIIC submarines were preceded by the shorter Type VIIB submarines. U-1192 had a displacement of  when at the surface and  while submerged. She had two shafts and two  propellers.

U-1192 was fitted with five  torpedo tubes (four fitted at the bow and one at the stern), fourteen torpedoes or 26 TMA mines, one  SK C/35 naval gun, (220 rounds), one  Flak M42 and two twin  C/30 anti-aircraft guns. The boat had a complement of between 44 — 52 men.

Service history
U-1192 was scuttled on 3 May 1945 at Kiel. Her wreck was raised and broken up.

References

Bibliography

External links
 

German Type VIIC submarines
U-boats commissioned in 1943
World War II submarines of Germany
Ships built in Danzig
1943 ships
Operation Regenbogen (U-boat)
Ships built by Schichau
Maritime incidents in May 1945